The Widow's Cruise is a 1959 British detective novel by Cecil Day-Lewis, written under the pen name of Nicholas Blake. It is the thirteenth in a series of novels featuring the private detective Nigel Strangeways.

Synopsis
Strangeways and his friend the sculptress arrange to go on a cruise ship visiting the Greek Islands. Soon they become aware of the underlying tensions between their fellow passengers, before a murder is committed.

References

Bibliography
 Bargainnier, Earl F. Twelve Englishmen of Mystery. Popular Press, 1984.
 Reilly, John M. Twentieth Century Crime & Mystery Writers. Springer, 2015.
 Stanford, Peter. C Day-Lewis: A Life. A&C Black, 2007.

1959 British novels
Novels by Cecil Day-Lewis
British crime novels
Collins Crime Club books
Novels set in London
Novels set in Greece
British detective novels